Legal recognition of a status or fact in a jurisdiction is formal acknowledgement of it as being true, valid, legal, or worthy of consideration, and may involve approval or the granting of rights.

For example, a nation or territory may require a person to hold a professional qualification to practice an occupation, such as medicine. While any establishment may grant a qualification, only recognised qualifications from recognised establishments entitle the holder to practice the restricted occupation. Qualifications from another jurisdiction may or may not be recognised. This way, the state controls and regulates access; for example, physicians of unknown competence may not practice, and it may be desired to protect employment of local people.

Another example is that any person can undergo a form of marriage with anyone or anything, and claim to be married. However, a marriage which is recognised affords the participant certain rights and obligations, e.g., possible reduction in taxes, obligation not to abandon the spouse, etc. Hypothetically, a person who claims to be married to a horse, has no rights and no obligations, and is subject to legal sanctions for any attempt to practice what would be conjugal rights if a marriage was recognised. In the early twenty-first century, there was much controversy about recognising marriages between couples of the same sex.

Article 16 of International Covenant on Civil and Political Rights requires right to be recognition everywhere as a person before the law. The derogation from this is prohibited, even in time of public emergency which threaten the life of the nation is officially proclaimed.

Legal recognition varies between jurisdictions. A person may be recognised as a physician, and to have been married and divorced in one jurisdiction; upon moving to another jurisdiction, some or all of these issues may not be recognised. The new jurisdiction, while not recognising the medical qualification as such, may allow it to be used to give the right to take a short qualifying course leading to a recognised qualification, or may disregard it entirely.

Diplomatic recognition is a similar concept, whereby one state acknowledges the existence as an entity of another.

References

See also
Legal status of transgender people
Minority rights
Spousal privilege
Legal status of same-sex marriage

Legal terminology